The Ancient and Primitive Rite of Memphis-Misraïm is a masonic rite founded in Naples, Italy in September 1881 by the merger of two older rites; the Rite of Misraïm and the Rite of Memphis. Although founded in 1881, its predecessors have their origins in the 18th century. The system is sometimes known as "Egyptian Freemasonry" due to the invocation of hermetic-derived esoteric symbolism referencing Ancient Egypt in its system of degrees.

Memphis-Misraïm was governed internationally under a Grand Hierophant from 1881 until 1923. This first of these was Giuseppe Garibaldi, the famous military leader of the Risorgimento, who had also been Grand Master of the Grand Orient of Italy. After his death, there was factionalism within the organisation, until eventually, the English freemason John Yarker emerged as Grand Hierophant in 1902. He was succeeded by Theodor Reuss in 1913 until his death in 1923.

The group in France, later renamed the Grande Loge Française du Rite ancien et primitif de Memphis-Misraïm continued to exist, despite the cessassion of activities from the international governance after Reuss' death. Charles Detré (Tedé), Jean Bricaud, Constant Chevillon, Charles-Henry Dupont, Robert Ambelain and Gérard Kloppel were Grand Masters of the French organisation. In particular, Ambelain played a significant role in reforming the rituals of Memphis-Misraïm in 1960.

Recognition by mainstream Freemasonry
	
The Rite of Memphis-Misraim is not practiced by any Regular Masonic organization.

History

The Rite of Misraïm
From as early as 1738, one can find traces of this Rite filled with alchemical, occult and Egyptian references, with a structure of 90 degrees. Joseph Balsamo, called Cagliostro, a key character of his time, gave the Rite the impulse necessary for its development. Very close to the Grand Master of the Order of the Knights of Malta, Manuel Pinto de Fonseca, Cagliostro founded the Rite of High Egyptian Masonry in 1784. Between 1767 and 1775 he received the Arcana Arcanorum, which are three very high hermetic degrees, from Sir Knight Luigi d’Aquino, the brother of the national Grand Master of Neapolitan Masonry. In 1788, he introduced them into the Rite of Misraïm and gave a patent to this Rite.

It developed quickly in Milan, Genoa and Naples. In 1813, it was introduced by Joseph, Michel and Marc Bédarride.

The Rite of Memphis

The Rite of Memphis was constituted by Jacques Étienne Marconis de Nègre in 1838, as a variant of the Rite of Misraïm, combining elements from Templarism and chivalry with Egyptian and alchemical mythology. It had at least two lodges (“Osiris” and “Des Philadelphes”) at Paris, two more (“La Bienveillance” and “De Heliopolis”) in Brussels, and a number of English supporters. The Rite gained a certain success among military Lodges. It took on a political dimension and in 1841 it became dormant, probably because of the repression following the armed uprising of Louis Blanqui’s Société des Saisons in 1839.  With the overthrow of Louis-Philippe in 1848, the Order was revived on March 5, with its most prominent member being Louis Blanc, a socialist member of the provisional government with responsibility for the National Workshops.

In 1850 Les Sectateurs de Ménès was founded in London which proved popular with refugees fleeing France for London at that time. About ten lodges were set up by French refugees, the most important being La Grand Loge des Philadelphes chartered in London on January 31, 1851, which continued to exist until the late 1870s. During this time it had about 100 members, often called Philadelphes. Between 1853 and 1856 other lodges of the Rite of Memphis were established.

In 1856, Benoît Desquesnes, the exiled secretary of the Société des Ouvriers Typographes de Nord proposed that the higher degrees of the Rite of Memphis were not only superfluous, but undemocratic and inconsistent with the Masonic ideals of equality. Despite the attempts of Jean Philibert Berjeau to dissolve the Philadelphes, they implemented this proposal and elected Edouard Benoît as master. This group became renowned for their involvement in revolutionary politics. However the Gymnosophists and the L'Avenir lodges remained with Berjeau. In 1860 the number of degrees was reduced to 33 in France, The other bodies of the Rite did not agree to this truncation of the degrees, and by 1866 Berjeau dissolved them (in France), most of the Gymnosophists joining the Philadelphes.

The Rite of Memphis-Misraïm

In 1881, General Giuseppe Garibaldi prepared to fuse the two Rites, to be effective as of 1889. Its popularity was greatly increased owing to the works of German Masonic scholar Theodor Reuss, the agent of John Yarker, who became Deputy Grand Master in 1902 and Grand Master in 1905. Reuss succeeded Yarker in this office in 1913.  Reuss' lineage was reduced into a nine degree structure which eventually became the original, Mixed (male and female) Masonic Ordo Templi Orientis with a tenth degree for the position of Outer Head of the Order.

Aleister Crowley, claimed the position of Outer Head of the Order in 1923 and was officially voted in as Outer Head in 1925, would eventually reform Ordo Templi Orientis into a Para-Masonic Body in which the rituals were reworked to provide a greater focus on both ceremonial magic and his vision of Thelema.  He also changed the three former Symbolic Masonic Degrees of Entered Apprentice, Fellow-Craft (or Companion) and Master Mason into three rituals alluding to an esoteric Templar lineage with the names of Man, Magician and Master Magician.  According to Crowley's own writings, this was done because (unlike the Masonic scene in Continental Europe) the overwhelming majority of Freemasons in the United States of America and the British Commonwealth nations were members of "Regular" Freemasonry with alliance to the United Grand Lodge of England, whose tenets, among other things, do not allow women to be initiated to this day.  Thus, Ordo Templi Orientis became an order that was completely independent of Freemasonry and its parental Rite, the Ancient and Primitive Rite of Memphis - Misraïm.

Prominent members
Some of the most prominent figures in European occultism have been associated with the Rite, including the Frenchmen; Gerard Encausse (Papus), Charles Detré (Tedé), Jean Bricaud, Constant Chevillon, Charles-Henry Dupont and Robert Ambelain. As shown, Michael Bertiaux has also been a major, though pragmatically quiet, major figure in the Rite. The National Grand Master in Germany from 1906 to 1914 was Rudolf Steiner and the founder of the Thule Society, Adam Alfred Rudolf Glauer (Rudolf von Sebottendorf), became an initiate while living in Turkey. The German founder of the Fraternitas Rosicruciana Antiqua, Arnold Krumm-Heller, was also associated. Aleister Crowley, was at one time affiliated with the rite in its shortened version used by Ordo Templi Orientis. In the United States, Harvey Spencer Lewis, founder of the Ancient Mystical Order Rosae Crucis, AMORC, was also associated with the rite.

Universal Grand Hierophants
Giuseppe Garibaldi (1881 - 1882)
Giambattista Pessina (1882 - 1900)
Ferdinando Francesco degli Oddi (1900 - 1902)
John Yarker (1902 - 1913)
Theodor Reuss (1913 - 1923)
Between 1924 and 1930 there was no recognized Universal Grand Hierophant.

See also
 Ancient and Primitive Rite
 List of Masonic Rites
 Philadelphes
 Ordo Templi Orientis

References

External links
 International Sovereign Sanctuary
 Ancient and Primitive Rite of Memphis-Misraim
 Memphis-Misraim in the Netherlands

Further reading
 Boris Nicolaevsky, “Secret Societies and the First International,” in The Revolutionary Internationals, 1864–1943, ed. Milored M. Drachkovitch (Stanford, 1966), 36–56.
 Faulks, Philippa and Robert L.D. Cooper. 2008. The Masonic Magician: The Life and Death of Count Cagliostro and His Egyptian Rite. London, Watkins Publishing
 
 Prescott, Andrew. The Cause of Humanity: Charles Bradlaugh and Freemasonry

Masonic rites
Organizations established in 1889